Lars Ytting Bak (born 16 January 1980) is a Danish former professional road bicycle racer, who rode professionally between 2002 and 2019 for the Fakta,  and  squads. From 2022, Bak will act as team manager for UCI Women's WorldTeam .

Background
Born in Silkeborg, Bak became a professional in 2002 for Team Fakta where he rode with fellow Dane Allan Johansen.

Here, Bak won the Danish Road Racing Championship, and in the later half of the season he showed his strength and talent as a good upcoming rider, as he won the respected ten stage Under 25 race, the Tour de l'Avenir. He won the leader's jersey by sprinting to the win in a group of four riders on the first stage, a position he defended through the following nine stages bar one, including a time trial and a number of hilly stages.

In 2011 he finally made his Tour de France debut where he worked hard for Mark Cavendish's sprint train and finished off by taking part in a breakaway on the last stage. Bak joined  for the 2012 season.

In 2012, he won stage 12 of the Giro d'Italia.

Bak retired at the end of the 2019 season after 18 years as a professional.

Major results

2000
 1st Stage 2a Le Triptyque des Monts et Châteaux
2001
 5th Overall Le Triptyque des Monts et Châteaux
2003
 6th Veenendaal–Veenendaal
 6th Druivenkoers Overijse
 7th Omloop van de Vlaamse Scheldeboorden
2004
 5th Kampioenschap van Vlaanderen
 9th Overall Tour de Luxembourg
1st Stage 1
 9th Overall Danmark Rundt
2005
 National Road Championships
1st  Road race
3rd Time trial
 1st  Overall Tour de l'Avenir
1st Stage 1
 1st Paris–Bourges
 6th CSC Classic
2006
 1st Stage 1 (TTT) Vuelta a España
 1st Eindhoven Team Time Trial
 4th Overall Bayern–Rundfahrt
 8th Grand Prix d'Ouverture La Marseillaise
2007
 1st  Time trial, National Road Championships
 1st Stage 5 Tour de Wallonie
 3rd Overall Tour Down Under
 6th Overall Four Days of Dunkirk
2008
 1st  Time trial, National Road Championships
 2nd Overall Tour de Pologne
1st Stage 1 (TTT)
 2nd Overall Herald Sun Tour
 7th Overall Bayern–Rundfahrt
 9th Overall Sachsen Tour
 9th Overall Circuit Franco-Belge
2009
 1st  Time trial, National Road Championships
 6th Overall Tour de Romandie
 7th Overall Eneco Tour
1st Stage 5
 8th Overall Danmark Rundt
 9th Overall Tour of Missouri
2010
 1st Stage 1 (TTT) Vuelta a España
 2nd Road race, National Road Championships
 8th Overall Danmark Rundt
2011
 1st Stage 1 (TTT) Giro d'Italia
 3rd GP Herning
 5th Paris–Roubaix
 8th Overall Ster ZLM Toer
2012
 1st Grand Prix de Fourmies
 1st Stage 12 Giro d'Italia
 10th Overall Ster ZLM Toer
2013
 2nd Overall Danmark Rundt
2014
 2nd Overall Danmark Rundt
2015
 2nd Overall Danmark Rundt
 6th Overall Three Days of De Panne
2018
 10th Cadel Evans Great Ocean Road Race
2019
 7th Paris–Tours

Grand Tour general classification results timeline

References

External links

 
Profile at Team Saxo Bank (source for this article)

1980 births
Living people
Danish male cyclists
People from Silkeborg
Danish Giro d'Italia stage winners
Cyclists at the 2012 Summer Olympics
Olympic cyclists of Denmark
Sportspeople from the Central Denmark Region